Yoandys Alberto Lescay Pardo (born 5 January 1994) is a Cuban sprinter.

He reached the semi-finals in the 200 metres at the 2012 World Junior Championships in Athletics in Barcelona.

Personal bests
200 m: 20.83 s (wind: +0.5 m/s) –  La Habana, 19 March 2014
400 m: 45.00 s –  2016 Summer Olympics, 13 August 2015

International competitions

References

External links

Tilastopaja biography

1994 births
Living people
Cuban male sprinters
World Athletics Championships athletes for Cuba
Athletes (track and field) at the 2015 Pan American Games
Athletes (track and field) at the 2019 Pan American Games
Pan American Games silver medalists for Cuba
Pan American Games medalists in athletics (track and field)
Athletes (track and field) at the 2016 Summer Olympics
Olympic athletes of Cuba
Universiade medalists in athletics (track and field)
Competitors at the 2018 Central American and Caribbean Games
Central American and Caribbean Games gold medalists for Cuba
Universiade silver medalists for Cuba
Central American and Caribbean Games medalists in athletics
Medalists at the 2017 Summer Universiade
Medalists at the 2015 Pan American Games
People from Las Tunas Province
21st-century Cuban people